Sørskot Chapel is a chapel of the Church of Norway in Steigen Municipality in Nordland county, Norway. It is located in the village of Sørskot. It is an annex chapel in the Leiranger parish which is part of the Salten prosti (deanery) in the Diocese of Sør-Hålogaland. The white, wooden chapel (with attached church hall) was built in a rectangular style in 1953 as a school, but on 22 April 1977 it was consecrated for use by the Church of Norway. The chapel seats about 70 people.

See also
List of churches in Sør-Hålogaland

References

Steigen
Churches in Nordland
Wooden churches in Norway
20th-century Church of Norway church buildings
Churches completed in 1953
1977 establishments in Norway
Rectangular churches in Norway